Kownaty may refer to the following places:
Kownaty, Łosice County in Masovian Voivodeship (east-central Poland)
Kownaty, Płońsk County in Masovian Voivodeship (east-central Poland)
Kownaty, Podlaskie Voivodeship (north-east Poland)
Kownaty, Greater Poland Voivodeship (west-central Poland)
Kownaty, Lubusz Voivodeship (west Poland)